Simons General Store is a historic general store located at Ancram in Columbia County, New York. It was built in 1873–74 and is a rectangular shaped three story frame structure.  It features a cupola and an elaborate two story piazza. The interior features original furniture and fixtures dating between 1874 and 1895, with electric fixtures dating between 1911 and 1915.

It was added to the National Register of Historic Places in 1973.

References

External links
The Ancram Preservation Group website

Commercial buildings on the National Register of Historic Places in New York (state)
Commercial buildings completed in 1874
Buildings and structures in Columbia County, New York
National Register of Historic Places in Columbia County, New York
1874 establishments in New York (state)
General stores in the United States